St Paul's Cathedral, Sale is the cathedral church of the Anglican Diocese of Gippsland in Australia. The cathedral building, built in 1884 to a design by Nathaniel Billing, is a double storey building with a rectangular footprint and is constructed of red brick and slate roofing.

The cathedral's interior is decorated in a Gothic style expressing a high church liturgy. The walls are of white rendered plaster with Oregon roof buttressing. Above the sanctuary is the "great western window" depicting the Sermon on the Mount and several other windows include St Paul's vision of the Macedonian and the diocese's coat of arms line the nave. Within the nave are a Lady chapel, a bishop's chapel and an honour roll.

The cathedral's pipe organ was built in 1882 by George Fincham and was restored in 1981.

The parish priest of the cathedral parish is known as the dean.

References

External links
Cathedral Parish website
Diocese of Gippsland website

Anglican cathedrals in Australia
Sale, Paul
Anglicanism
20th-century Anglican church buildings
Sale, Victoria
Sale, Psul
1884 establishments in Australia
Churches completed in 1884